The Milford Mine produced high manganese-content iron ore 
in Wolford Township, Minnesota, United States. On February 5, 1924, it was the site of the Milford Mine Disaster, the worst mining accident in Minnesota history, when it was flooded by water from a nearby lake, killing 41 miners. Only seven men were able to climb to safety.  Starting in 2010, the site has been under development by Crow Wing County as Milford Mine Memorial Park. The property was listed as the Milford Mine Historic District on the National Register of Historic Places in 2011 for its state-level significance in the themes of industry and historical archaeology. It was nominated for its association with a significant event in Minnesota history, and for potential archaeological resources that could illuminate mining technology, the rise and fall of iron-ore mining on the Cuyuna Range, and the daily lives of its workers.

Background
Manganese ore, an ingredient used to make steel, was shipped from the Milford site to Duluth then to steel factories in cities including Detroit and Cleveland.

Milford Disaster
The disaster occurred when a surface cave-in at the mine's easternmost end tapped into mud that was a direct connection to Foley Lake. In less than 20 minutes the mineshaft flooded to within  of the surface. Seven men made it to ground level, while 41 were overcome by the water or trapped in mud. The last victim's remains were recovered nine months later.

15-year-old Frank Hrvatin, Jr., one of the survivors, worked alongside his father Frank Hrvatin, Sr. On February 5, Hrvatin, Jr. was working with his senior partner Harry Hosford. When they saw the floodwater, they ran for the ladder that ascended  to the surface. Miner Matt Kangas was ahead of them on the ladder. As the water rose and Kangas slowed from the effort of climbing such a distance, Hrvatin climbed between Kangas' legs and propelled the man up the ladder. Hosford was waist-deep in water when Hrvatin reached down and pulled him out of the mine. They were the last three to make it out alive. Frank Hrvatin, Sr. was deeper in the mine and did not survive.

List of miners lost in the Milford Disaster

Earl Bedard
Mike Bizal
Oliver Burns
George Butkovich
Emil Carlson
Valentine Cole
Evan Crellin
Roy Cunningham
Minor Graves
Clinton A. Harris
Fred Harte
John Hendrickson
John Hlacher
George Hochever
Herman Holm
Elmer Haug
Frank Hrvatin
William Johnson
Alex Jyhla
Victor Ketola
Leo J. LaBrash
Arvid Lehti
Peter Magdich
Henry Maki
John Maurich
Ronald McDonald
Arthur Myhres
John Minerich
Nick Radich
Clyde Revord
Gaspar H. Revord
Nels Ritari
Jerome Ryan
Tony Slack
Joseph Snyder
Marko Toljan
Mike Tomac
Martin Valencich
Arthur Wolford
John Yaklich
Fred Zeitz

Aftermath
Thirty-eight of the 41 miners who drowned were married, leaving behind more than 80 children.

Recovery efforts were both delicate and dangerous, as the mine was filled with mud and debris. Further, workers worried about potential cave-ins. It took months to recover the men's bodies. The last body was removed on November 9. The mine resumed operations soon after that.

Minnesota governor J. A. O. Preus appointed a five-man committee to investigate the disaster, which held hearings in May and June. Its final report said: "No blame can be attached to the mining company for this unfortunate accident. The real cause of the disaster was the fact that imminence and danger from such a rush of mud was not recognized by anyone."

The mine closed in 1932 due to the decline in demand for steel during the Great Depression.

See also
 National Register of Historic Places listings in Crow Wing County, Minnesota

References

External links
 Milford Mine Memorial Park

1924 disasters in the United States
1924 mining disasters
Archaeological sites on the National Register of Historic Places in Minnesota
Disasters in Minnesota
Former mines in the United States
Industrial buildings and structures on the National Register of Historic Places in Minnesota
Manganese mines in the United States
Mines in Minnesota
Mining disasters in the United States
National Register of Historic Places in Crow Wing County, Minnesota
Protected areas of Crow Wing County, Minnesota